Something to Look Forward To may refer to:

"Something to Look Forward To", a song by Clearlake from their 2001 album Lido
"Something to Look Forward To", a song by Spoon from their 2002 album Kill the Moonlight